The Rabha Hasong Autonomous Council (RHAC) was constituted by the Government of Assam in 1995. It was constituted for development in the areas of economic, educational, socio-cultural and ethnic identity of Rabha people residing in the council area. RHAC has different tribes such as Rabha, Bodo, Assamese, Garo, Hajong, etc. The majority of the population in RHAC is Rabha. Currently the RHAC head office is located at Dudhnoi Assam. The Chief of the RACH is Tankeswar Rabha.

History
The Rabha Hasong Autonomous Council (RHAC) has been constituted with its headquarters at Dudhnai town. The jurisdiction of this council extends up to Rani area of Kamrup district and embraces almost the entire district of Goalpara. The autonomous council has been created to fulfill the longstanding demands of the Rabha people of the area.

The first elections was held in 2013 to constitute the General Council.

See also 
 Rabha people
 Rabha language

References

External links 
 goalpara.gov.in/rabha_hasong.htm

Goalpara district
2013 establishments in Assam